Highway 321 (AR 321, Ark. 321, Hwy. 321) is a designation for two north–south state highways in central Arkansas. One route of  runs from Highway 5/Highway 367 in Cabot north to Highway 38 east of Austin. A second route of  begins at AR 31 north of Beebe and runs north to Highway 267.

Route description

Cabot to Austin
Highway 321 begins near an exit from US 67/US 167 (Future I-57) at Highway 5 and Highway 367 in Cabot. The route intersects Highway 89 in south Cabot before exiting the city and running due east. Near Oak Grove the route turns due north, with Highway 321 Spur (AR 321S) continuing east to Highway 31. A 2010 study of annual average daily traffic (AADT) by the Arkansas State Highway and Transportation Department (AHTD) reveals that about 19,000 vehicles per day (VPD) use the route between its southern terminus and Highway 89/Highway 367, with the traffic count dropping to 7,000 VPD between that junction and the Cabot city limits. Traffic counts continue around 2,500 VPD until the Highway 321S junction, then drop to 2,100 VPD for the remainder of the route.

Beebe to Essex
Highway 321 begins north of Beebe at Highway 31. The route runs north, having a junction with Highway 321 Spur and passing through Essex. The highway continues north and terminates at Highway 267. An AHTD traffic count from 2010 reveals that the average annual daily traffic never exceeds 640 vehicles per day anywhere on the route.

Major intersections

Special routes

Lonoke County spur

Highway 321 Spur (AR 321S, Ark. 321S, and Hwy. 321S) is an east–west state highway spur route in Lonoke County. The route of  serves as a connector between Highway 321 and Highway 31.

Major intersections

White County spur

Highway 321 Spur (AR 321S, Ark. 321S, and Hwy. 321S) is an east–west state highway spur route in White County. The route of  serves as a short connector between Highway 321 and Highway 31.

Major intersections

See also

 List of state highways in Arkansas

References

External links

321
Transportation in Lonoke County, Arkansas
Transportation in White County, Arkansas